Joliette is a provincial electoral district in the Lanaudière region of Quebec, Canada that elects members to the National Assembly of Quebec. It notably includes the cities of Joliette and Saint-Charles-Borromée.

It was created for the 1867 election (and an electoral district of that name existed earlier in the Legislative Assembly of the Province of Canada).  Its final election was in 1970.  It disappeared in the 1973 election and its successor electoral district was Joliette-Montcalm.

However, Joliette-Montcalm disappeared in the 1981 election and Joliette was recreated from parts of Joliette-Montcalm and Berthier electoral districts.

In the change from the 2001 to the 2011 electoral map, it lost Sainte-Marcelline-de-Kildare to Berthier electoral district but gained Sainte-Mélanie from that same electoral district.

In the change from the 2011 to the 2017 electoral map, the riding will lose Saint-Jacques, Saint-Liguori and Sainte-Marie-Salomé to the riding of Rousseau.

Members of the Legislative Assembly / National Assembly

Election results

2014 source:

2012 source:

|-
 
|Liberal
|Christian Trudel
|align="right"|9,175
|align="right"|28.83
|align="right"|+8.61

|-

|-

|Independent
|Pablo Lugo-Herrera
|align="right"|246
|align="right"|0.77
|align="right"|-
|}

|-
 
|Liberal
|Céline Beaulieu
|align="right"|7,527
|align="right"|20.22
|align="right"|-13.40
|-

|-

|}
* Increase is from UFP

|-
 
|Liberal
|Robert Groulx
|align="right"|11,161
|align="right"|33.62
|align="right"|+8.89

|-

|-

|}

|-
 
|Liberal
|Pierre Delangis
|align="right"|7,064
|align="right"|24.73
|align="right"|-2.62
|-

|Independent (UFP)
|Mathieu Lessard
|align="right"|1,421
|align="right"|4.97
|align="right"|-
|}

|-
 
|Liberal
|Sylvie Lespérance
|align="right"|9,636
|align="right"|27.35
|align="right"|+1.61

|-

|Socialist Democracy
|Alexandre Martel
|align="right"|504
|align="right"|1.43
|align="right"|-
|}

|-
 
|Liberal
|Pierre Delangis
|align="right"|8,712
|align="right"|25.74
|align="right"|-3.80

|-

|Natural Law
|Gilles Roy
|align="right"|581
|align="right"|1.72
|align="right"|-
|}

|-
 
|Liberal
|Sylvie Lespérance
|align="right"|9,045
|align="right"|29.54
|align="right"|-13.80
|-

|-

|-

|}

|-
 
|Liberal
|Donatien Corriveau
|align="right"|13,113
|align="right"|43.34
|align="right"|+7.92
|-

|-

|Progressive Conservative
|Michel Carignan
|align="right"|659
|align="right"|2.18
|align="right"|-

|-

|-

|Christian Socialist
|Marlène Labelle
|align="right"|58
|align="right"|0.19
|align="right"|-
|}

|-
 
|Liberal
|André Asselin
|align="right"|11,143
|align="right"|35.42
|align="right"|+7.26
|-

|}

|-
 
|Liberal
|Robert Quenneville
|align="right"|10,929
|align="right"|40.32
|align="right"|-0.62
|-

|-

|}

|-

|-
 
|Liberal
|Maurice Desrochers
|align="right"|9,136
|align="right"|40.94
|align="right"|+14.04
|-

|RIN
|Laurent Mailhot
|align="right"|1,423
|align="right"|6.38
|align="right"|-
|-

|Ralliement national
|René Bonin
|align="right"|386
|align="right"|1.73
|align="right"|-
|}

|-

|-
 
|Liberal
|Gaston Lambert
|align="right"|5,199
|align="right"|26.90
|-
}
|Independent Lib.
|Maurice Desrochers
|align="right"|3,891
|align="right"|20.13
|}

|-
 
|Liberal
|Gaston Lambert
|align="right"|10,361
|align="right"|62.72
|-

|-

|Independent
|J.-Marcel Ostiguy
|align="right"|1,011
|align="right"|6.12
|}

|-

|-
 
|Liberal
|Joseph-Aimé-Conrad Boisvert
|align="right"|6,794
|align="right"|35.25
|}

|-

|-
 
|Liberal
|Joseph-Aimé-Conrad Boisvert
|align="right"|6,225
|align="right"|35.12
|}

|-

|-
 
|Liberal
|Georges-Émile Lapalme
|align="right"|7,482
|align="right"|42.12
|}

|-

|-
 
|Liberal
|Maurice Breton
|align="right"|5,452
|align="right"|33.80
|-
 
|Union of Electors
|A.-Émile Ducharme
|align="right"|195
|align="right"|1.21
|}

|-

|-
 
|Liberal
|Victor Masse
|align="right"|4,997
|align="right"|35.71

|-

|-
 
|Liberal
|Lucien Dugas
|align="right"|3,223
|align="right"|48.18
|}

|-

|-
 
|Liberal
|Lucien Dugas
|align="right"|3,066
|align="right"|46.03
|}

|-
 
|Liberal
|Lucien Dugas
|align="right"|3,484
|align="right"|53.32
|-

|Conservative
|Antonio Barrette
|align="right"|3,050
|align="right"|46.68
|}

|-
 
|Liberal
|Lucien Dugas
|align="right"|3,089
|align="right"|54.70
|-

|Conservative
|Robert Tellier
|align="right"|2,558
|align="right"|45.30
|}

|-
 
|Liberal
|Lucien Dugas
|align="right"|3,170
|align="right"|59.04
|-

|Conservative
|Pierre-Joseph Dufresne
|align="right"|2,199
|align="right"|40.96
|}

|-

|Conservative
|Pierre-Joseph Dufresne
|align="right"|2,857
|align="right"|55.80
|-
 
|Liberal
|Lucien Dugas
|align="right"|2,263
|align="right"|44.20
|}

|-

|Conservative
|Pierre-Joseph Dufresne
|align="right"|2,174
|align="right"|51.49
|-
 
|Liberal
|Ernest Hébert
|align="right"|2,048
|align="right"|48.51
|}

|-
 
|Liberal
|Ernest Hébert
|align="right"|2,484
|align="right"|52.67
|-

|Conservative
|Joseph-Pierre Laporte
|align="right"|2,232
|align="right"|47.33
|}

|-

|Conservative
|Joseph-Mathias Tellier
|align="right"|2,408
|align="right"|50.43
|-
 
|Liberal
|Joseph Gadoury
|align="right"|2,367
|align="right"|49.57
|}

|-

|Conservative
|Joseph-Mathias Tellier
|align="right"|2,065
|align="right"|50.33
|-
 
|Liberal
|Joseph Gadoury
|align="right"|2,038
|align="right"|49.67
|}

|-

|Conservative
|Joseph-Mathias Tellier
|align="right"|2,030
|align="right"|54.00
|-
 
|Liberal
|Gédéon Desrosiers
|align="right"|1,729
|align="right"|46.00
|}

|-

|Conservative
|Joseph-Mathias Tellier
|align="right"|1,868
|align="right"|52.09
|-
 
|Liberal
|Joseph Gadoury
|align="right"|1,718
|align="right"|47.91
|}

|-

|Conservative
|Joseph-Mathias Tellier
|align="right"|1,747
|align="right"|50.40
|-
 
|Liberal
|François-Octave Dugas
|align="right"|1,733
|align="right"|49.80
|}

|-

|Conservative
|Joseph-Mathias Tellier
|align="right"|1,678
|align="right"|51.02
|-
 
|Liberal
|Louis Basinet
|align="right"|1,611
|align="right"|48.98
|}

|-
 
|Liberal
|Louis Basinet
|colspan=2|acclaimed
|}

|-
 
|Liberal
|Louis Basinet
|align="right"|1,496
|align="right"|53.54
|-

|Conservative
|Onésime Perreault
|align="right"|1,298
|align="right"|46.46
|}

|-
 
|Liberal
|Louis Basinet
|align="right"|1,414
|align="right"|51.44
|-

|Conservative
|Joseph-Norbert-Alfred McConville
|align="right"|1,335
|align="right"|48.56
|}

|-

|Conservative
|Joseph-Norbert-Alfred McConville
|align="right"|1,304
|align="right"|50.27
|-
 
|Liberal
|Louis Basinet
|align="right"|1,290
|align="right"|49.73
|}

|-

|Conservative
|Vincent-Paul Lavallée
|align="right"|797
|align="right"|39.40
|-
 
|Liberal
|Auguste Guilbaut
|align="right"|709
|align="right"|35.05
|-
}
|Independent Cons.
|Édouard Guilbaut
|align="right"|517
|align="right"|25.56
|}

|-

|Conservative
|Vincent-Paul Lavallée
|align="right"|1,156
|align="right"|54.94
|-
 
|Liberal
|Auguste Guilbaut
|align="right"|948
|align="right"|45.06
|}

|-

|Conservative
|Vincent-Paul Lavallée
|colspan=2|acclaimed
|}

|-

|Conservative
|Vincent-Paul Lavallée
|align="right"|1,068
|align="right"|70.08
|-
 
|Liberal
|François-Benjamin Godin
|align="right"|456
|align="right"|29.92
|}

|-

|Conservative
|Vincent-Paul Lavallée
|align="right"|930
|align="right"|52.04
|-
 
|Liberal
|Cornellier dit Grand-Champ, H. 
|align="right"|857
|align="right"|47.96
|}

References

External links
Information
 Elections Quebec

Election results
 Election results (National Assembly)

Maps
 2011 map (PDF)
 2001 map (Flash)
2001–2011 changes  (Flash)
1992–2001 changes (Flash)
 Electoral map of Lanaudière region
 Quebec electoral map, 2011

Quebec provincial electoral districts
Joliette